Pupalia is a genus of flowering plants belonging to the family Amaranthaceae.

Its native range is Tropical and Subtropical Old World.

Species:

Pupalia grandiflora 
Pupalia lappacea 
Pupalia micrantha 
Pupalia robecchii

References

Amaranthaceae
Amaranthaceae genera